Electoral region may refer to one of the following forms of constituency:
Electoral region (Bulgaria), roughly corresponding to the 28 provinces (Bulgarian: Области, Oblasti) of Bulgaria
Electoral region (Senedd) 
Electoral region (Scottish Parliament) 
Electoral regions of Western Australia (see Electoral districts of Western Australia),